Özcan Köksoy (1940 – 23 March 2022) was a Turkish footballer who played as a defender. He made one appearance for the Turkey national team in 1965.

Honours
Fenerbahçe
Süper Lig: 1963–64, 1964–65, 1967–68
Turkish Cup: 1967–68
Presidential Cup: 1968
Balkans Cup: 1966–67

References

1940 births
2022 deaths
Turkish footballers
Footballers from Istanbul
Association football defenders
Turkey international footballers
Fatih Karagümrük S.K. footballers
Fenerbahçe S.K. footballers